Królikowo  is a village in the administrative district of Gmina Olsztynek, within Olsztyn County, Warmian-Masurian Voivodeship, in northern Poland. The village has a population of 260.

References

Villages in Olsztyn County